In computer networking, Identity Web Services Framework is a protocol stack that profiles WS-Security, WS-Addressing, SAML and
adds new protocol specifications of its own, such as the Discovery Service, for open market per user service
discovery, and the People Service for delegation and social networking.

Development
The ID-WSF stack was developed by the Liberty Alliance. The first release, ID-WSF 1.0 (and subsequent 1.1 and 1.2) were
released in 2003. ID-WSF1 was interoperability tested among
several vendor implementations, which received certification from the Liberty Alliance.

However, the first version of ID-WSF was not widely adopted. Perhaps the only significant adoption was by France Telecom
and the French government's Mon Service Public. Some adoption happened in Japan as well. Liberty Alliance proceeded
to create an improved version, the ID-WSF 2.0 in 2006, which included harmonization with certain WS-* technologies,
such as WS-Addressing and WS-Security. These changes were vigorously, and successfully, lobbied by Conor Cahill
of AOL (at the time). ID-WSF 2.0 interoperability certification was participated by several major league vendors, as well
as by startups and open source projects.

Since then, ID-WSF 2.0 has become the only widely accepted interoperable profile of WS-* technologies. Its strength
is essentially in narrow focus where tight enough profile for interoperability was specified. ID-WSF 2.0 interoperability
certification by Liberty Alliance was accomplished by several vendors, including some open source.

ID-WSF 2.0 has been adopted as standards base by the Finnish e-government project and by the European Commission FP7 project TAS3.

List of Implementations of ID-WSF 
 Sun Microsystems
 Trustgenix
 NEC
 NTT
 Symlabs SFIS
 ZXID.org - the reference implementation of TAS3 -  Trusted Architecture for Securely Shareable Services, with Privacy
 Lasso, C library, bindings in Python, Java, Perl and PHP, GNU GPL Licence, developed by Entr'ouvert

References

Computer access control
XML-based standards